Aston-Jonction is a municipality in the Centre-du-Québec region of the province of Quebec in Canada. The population as of the Canada 2021 Census was 441.

Demographics

Population
Population trend:

(+) Amalgamation of the Parish of Saint-Raphaël-Partie-Sud and the Village of Aston-Jonction on March 26, 1997.

Language
Mother tongue language (2006)

See also
List of municipalities in Quebec

References

Municipalities in Quebec
Incorporated places in Centre-du-Québec
Designated places in Quebec
Nicolet-Yamaska Regional County Municipality